Crimidine is a convulsant poison used as a rodenticide. Crimidine was originally known by its product name, Castrix. It was originally produced in the 1940s by the conglomerate, IG Farben. It is classified as an extremely hazardous substance in the United States as defined in Section 302 of the U.S. Emergency Planning and Community Right-to-Know Act (42 U.S.C. 11002), and is subject to strict reporting requirements by facilities which produce, store, or use it in significant quantities. It is also no longer used in the United States as a rodenticide, but is still used to this day in other countries.

Mechanism of action
Crimidine is a highly reactive compound. The main mechanism of toxicity with crimidine is that it inhibits vitamin B6, which is used in the metabolism of carbohydrates and amino acids. This is due to the pyrimidine ring that both compounds contain. Although, the exact mechanism of how crimidine antagonizes vitamin B6 is unknown. Another mechanism of toxicity with crimidine is due to its deactivating effect on acetylcholinesterase
 

The serine residue, which is part of the acetylcholinesterase, acts a nucleophile and eventually replaces the C-Cl bond that is present in crimidine. Unlike with acetylcholine, the resulting serine-crimidine bond does not hydrolyze, permanently deactivating the enzyme

Toxicity
Crimidine is a fast acting convulsant, with an LD50 of 5 mg/kg. Earliest symptoms can develop within 20–40 minutes. These symptoms can include burning, irritation, and itching at the site of exposure or intake. Following these initial symptoms, convulsions follow and can be fatal. Low dose, long-term exposure can lead to damage in the central nervous system, resulting in muscle stiffness, restlessness, and sensitivity to light and noise. Although crimidine is fast acting, it is also quickly secreted and can pass through the system in less than 24 hours..

intravenous vitamin B6 should be given as soon as poisoning is suspected

References

External links

Convulsants
Pesticides
Pyrimidines
Chloroarenes
Acetylcholinesterase inhibitors
Chloropyrimidines
Vitamin B6 antagonists
Neurotoxins
Dimethylamino compounds